Do-hun, also spelled Do-hoon, is a Korean masculine given name. The meaning differs based on the hanja used to write each syllable of the name. There are 44 hanja with the reading "do" and 12 hanja with the reading "hun" on the South Korean government's official list of hanja which may be registered for use in given names.

People with this name include:
Kim Do-hoon (born 1970), South Korean former football player
Im Do-hun (born 1972), South Korean volleyball player
Na Do-hun (born 1993), South Korean contestant on Philippine television show Pinoy Big Brother: Teen Clash 2010

Fictional characters with this name include:
Ahn Do-hoon, in 2013 South Korean television series Secret Love
Baek Do-hoon, in 2013 South Korean television series King of Ambition

See also
List of Korean given names
Park Do-hun (born 1964), South Korean former handball player

References

Korean masculine given names